The 2004 Troy State Trojans football team represented Troy State University—now known as Troy University—as a first-year member of the Sun Belt Conference during the 2004 NCAA Division I-A football season. Led by 14th-year head coach Larry Blakeney, the Trojans compiled an overall record of 7–5 with a mark of 4–2 in conference play, good for second place in the Sun Belt. Troy State was invited to their first bowl game the Silicon Valley Football Classic, where the Trojans lost, 34–21, to Northern Illinois. The team played home games at Movie Gallery Stadium in Troy, Alabama.

Schedule

References

Troy State
Troy Trojans football seasons
Sun Belt Conference football champion seasons
Troy State Trojans football